Avinoam Kolodny is an Israeli professor of electrical engineering at Technion. He is an author and co-author of more than 160 books and peer-reviewed articles all of which were cited 6548 times.

References

Israeli engineers
20th-century births
Academic staff of Technion – Israel Institute of Technology
Living people
Year of birth missing (living people)